Alan Noel Latimer ('Tim') Munby (1913–1974) was an English author, writer and librarian.

Life and career
Born in Hampstead, Munby was educated at Clifton College and King's College, Cambridge. He is best known for his five-volume study of the eccentric nineteenth-century book collector Sir Thomas Phillipps, and for his slim volume of ghost stories, The Alabaster Hand, which includes three tales written in Oflag VII B, a German prisoner-of-war camp near Eichstätt, during World War II. These stories – 'The Topley Place Sale', 'The Four Poster' and 'The White Sack' – featured in a prison-camp magazine, Touchstone, edited by Elliott Viney, which was produced on a printing press owned by the Bishop of Eichstätt, Michael Rackl.

Munby worked in the antiquarian book trade with Bernard Quaritch, Limited (1935–37) and Sotheby & Company (1937–39, 1945–47). He became Librarian at King's College, Cambridge in 1947 and Fellow in 1948; he was J. P. R. Lyell Reader in Bibliography, University of Oxford (1962–63) and Sandars Reader in Bibliography, University of Cambridge (1969–70). He was elected President of the Bibliographical Society in 1974 and died during his term of office.

Reception
Boucher and McComas praised the stories in The Alabaster Hand as  "quietly terrifying modernizations of the M.R. James tradition".

Personal life
Munby married twice. His first marriage was to Joan Margaret Edelsten; and his second to Sheila Rachel Crowther-Smith.

Works

Books
(ed.) Letters to Leigh Hunt from his son Vincent (Cloanthus Press, 1934)
(with Desmond Flower) English Poetical Autographs (Cassell, 1938)
 "Some Caricatures of Book-Collectors – An Essay" (printed for private circulation by William H. Robinson Ltd, Christmas 1948)
The Alabaster Hand and other Ghost Stories (Dobson, 1949)
Phillips Studies, 5 vols. (Cambridge University Press, 1951–1960)
The Cult of the Autograph Letter in England (London: Athlone Press, 1962)
Connoisseurs and Medieval Miniatures 1750-1850 (Oxford: Clarendon Press, 1972)
Essays and Papers (ed. Nicolas Barker) (Scolar Press, 1977)

Short Stories
The Four-Poster. Touchstone, December 1944. Collected in The Alabaster Hand (1949).
The White Sack. Touchstone, January 1945. Collected in The Alabaster Hand (1949).
The Topley Place Sale. Touchstone, March 1945. Collected in The Alabaster Hand (1949).
The Inscription. Chamber's Journal, Date unknown. Collected in The Alabaster Hand (1949).
The Devil’s Autograph. Cambridge Review, Date unknown. Collected in The Alabaster Hand (1949).

See also
Lionel Keir Robinson

References

External links

King's College Library: 'Tim' Munby short biography with images of materials from Munby's papers at King's College Cambridge Library

1913 births
1974 deaths
People educated at Clifton College
English writers
Ghost story writers